Tridrepana trialba is a moth in the family Drepanidae. It was described by Allan Watson in 1957. It is found on Sulawesi in Indonesia.

The wingspan is about 27.6–35 mm for males and 37.6-38.8 mm for females. Adults can be distinguished from related species by a white (not brown) mid-cell spot on the upperside of the forewings.

References

Moths described in 1957
Drepaninae
Moths of Indonesia